Dashbolagh-e Moghar (also known as Dāshbolāgh) is a village in Vargahan Rural District, in the Central District of Ahar County, East Azerbaijan Province, Iran. At the 2006 census, its population was 160, in 29 families.

References 

Populated places in Ahar County